Freedom Square in Kharkiv, Ukraine, is the 8th largest city-centre square in Europe.

On 1 March 2022, during the battle of Kharkiv in the 2022 Russian invasion of Ukraine, the square and the surroundings were hit by Russian missiles.

Names

Upon the Soviet takeover the square was named Maidan Dzerzhynskoho in 1926 after Felix Dzerzhinsky, the founder of the Bolshevik secret police (the Cheka, precursor to the KGB). It is depicted on maps of Kharkiv of 1938. 

During the brief German occupation the name of the square changed twice: in 1942 the square was named German Army Square, and in 1943 Leibstandarte SS Square. After the independence of Ukraine it was renamed Freedom Square.

Location
The main part of the square is bordered to the west by the site of a removed statue of Lenin, to the east by Sumska Street, to the north by the Hotel Kharkiv and to the south by Shevchenko park.

Landmarks
A notable landmark of the square is the Derzhprom building, a prime example of constructivist architecture.

The Kharkiv regional state administration is situated at one end of the square.

A monumental statue of Lenin was erected in 1964 and was torn down by protesters on 28 September 2014. In August 2016 pavers were laid on the site where the statue of Lenin stood. A new fountain on the site of the former statue was opened on 23 August 2020.

Usage

Protests and rallies

In 2014 the square was the site of demonstrations by pro-Russian and pro-Ukrainian activists in Kharkiv. The issue was the statue of Lenin, which was fiercely defended by pro-Russian demonstrators against pro-Ukrainian activists' attempts to dismantle it.

Other events and recreational activities
Queen + Paul Rodgers kicked off their Rock the Cosmos Tour at Freedom Square on 12 September 2008 & gathered 350,000 audience members, the show was recorded for a DVD release, entitled Live in Ukraine, which was released on 15 June 2009.

Victory Parades 
From 2010 to 2013 it hosted an annual military parade in honor of Victory Day with the participation of the troops of the Kharkiv Garrison, military academies located in Kharkiv and troops from Russia.

Gallery

References

External links

 Freedom Square events
 Kharkiv Square Webcam

Buildings and structures in Kharkiv
Squares in Ukraine
Cultural infrastructure completed in 1926
Tourist attractions in Kharkiv Oblast
Shevchenkivskyi District (Kharkiv)